Planctobacterium is a Gram-negative, aerobic and motile bacteria genus from the family of Alteromonadaceae with one known species (Planctobacterium marinum). Planctobacterium marinum has been isolated from the South China Sea.

References

Alteromonadales
Monotypic bacteria genera
Bacteria genera